The Hampton Wind Park is a wind power station near Hampton, south-east of Lithgow, New South Wales, Australia. Initiated, developed and operated privately by a landholder, the farm has two wind turbines, with a total nameplate capacity of 1.32 MW of renewable electricity which is supplied to the main electricity grid.

Technical information 
Wind Corporation Australia, an energy development company, was established in 2000 by founding investor CVC REEF Limited to develop and commission the Hampton Wind Park. Project cost was A$2.4 million, funded by an investment by CVC-REEF and the NSW Sustainable Energy Development Authority (SEDA).

Opened in September 2001, the wind farm reduces greenhouse gases by 3,000 tonnes each year over the 20 year life of the project, compared to the equivalent electricity generation from coal. The wind turbines are Vestas V47-660 kW models, with  hub height and  rotor diameter.

The wind farm's output feeds the grid, and creates renewable energy credits which Integral Energy sells to its Green Power subscribers.

Gallery

See also

List of wind farms in Australia
Wind power in Australia

References 

Wind farms in New South Wales
Articles containing video clips
Energy infrastructure completed in 2001
2001 establishments in Australia